Ubisoft Film & Television (formerly known as Ubisoft Motion Pictures) is a French-American film and television production company and a subsidiary of video game publisher Ubisoft based in Montreuil and Los Angeles. The company was founded on 27 January 2011, and is in charge of producing films and television shows based on Ubisoft franchises and inspired by Ubisoft's worlds and gaming culture.

History 

Ubisoft Film & Television was created as Ubisoft Motion Pictures in January 2011 as the film production branch of the video game company Ubisoft. Its mission is to bring Ubisoft's games into new areas of entertainment and share original stories set in the world, culture, and community of gaming.

In 2012 and 2013, Ubisoft Film & Television announced a whole lineup of movie adaptations, including Assassin's Creed. On the TV side, the studio released its first kids' show Rabbids Invasion in 2013. The show, which premiered on Nickelodeon and France 3, was renewed for a second season in December 2013 and a third one in 2015. A fourth season was announced in July 2018 and was broadcast on Netflix worldwide.

Following the success of Rabbids Invasion, Ubisoft Film & Television and the French theme park Futuroscope opened the Raving Rabbids–based attraction The Time Machine in December 2013. The attraction, which has been awarded the Themed Entertainment Association Award for "Outstanding Achievement" in 2014, takes visitors for a trip through the great moments in History.

The company's first feature film, Assassin's Creed, opened in theaters in 2016 and starred Michael Fassbender and Marion Cotillard. The same year, GameSpot reported that Ubisoft is in talks with Netflix for a TV series based on their video games.

Tom Clancy's The Division is in development as a feature film for Netflix with David Leitch, Jake Gyllenhaal, and Jessica Chastain attached. Additional feature films in development include Just Dance, Rabbids, and Tom Clancy's Ghost Recon, executively produced by Michael Bay for Warner Bros.

The studio has greatly expanded its TV series lineup. Several animated projects were announced in September 2019 and a first live action TV series was launched: Mythic Quest: Raven's Banquet on Apple TV+. This project is also the first not to be attached to any Ubisoft game franchise. The series, which stars an ensemble cast that includes Rob McElhenney and F. Murray Abraham, has been renewed for a second season.

In June 2021, Netflix announced it had picked up Captain Laserhawk: A Blood Dragon Remix from Adi Shankar as well as the Splinter Cell and Far Cry animated series during the Geeked Week.

Productions

Films

Released

Upcoming

Live-action series

Released

Upcoming

Animated series

Released

Long-Form

Short-Form

Upcoming

References 

Mass media companies established in 2011
Ubisoft divisions and subsidiaries
Film production companies of France
French companies established in 2011

External links 
 Official website